Panchgram Union is an Union Parishad under Lohagara Upazila of Narail District in the division of Khulna, Bangladesh. It has an area of 51.80 km2 (20.00 sq mi) and a population of 18,315.

References

Unions of Kalia Upazila
Unions of Narail District
Unions of Khulna Division